Stéphane Bourgoin (born 14 March 1953) is a French true crime writer. He presented himself as an expert on serial killers for many years, until he admitted in 2020 that he had lied about many of his claimed experiences.

Life
He was expelled from high school three times and does not hold any diploma.

Bourgoin claimed to have moved to the United States in the early 1970s, where he allegedly found his then-girlfriend murdered, raped and mutilated by a serial killer in 1976 in Los Angeles. He said that the event led him to try to understand what goes on in the mind of serial killers. In 2020, however, Bourgoin confessed that the story was in fact an invention drawn from the case of Susan Bickrest, murdered at age 24 by serial killer Gerald Stano in 1975.

Works
Bourgoin has written 75 books and produced dozens of documentaries, with his books selling thousands of copies in France. He was regarded as France's best known serial killer expert. He occasionally lectured police on the subject, and critiqued media depictions of serial killers.

Some of his thousands of Facebook followers formed a group to more thoroughly investigate Bourgoin's stories, and found that many appeared to have been invented or plagiarized. They published their findings in 2019, and after French media covered the issue Bourgoin confessed; in 2021 he told a Guardian reporter that he had in fact met only 30 rather than 77 serial killers. In response to the scandal, Bourgoin was dropped by his publishers and producers.

References

1953 births
French documentary film producers
French film producers
French non-fiction writers
Living people
Non-fiction crime writers
People associated with true crime
Scandals in France
Writers from Paris
Journalistic hoaxes
Journalistic scandals